VNF may refer to:

 Voies navigables de France, a French navigation authority 
 Virtualized Network Functions, software implementations of network functions that can be deployed on a Network Function Virtualization Infrastructure